The women's 3000 meter at the 2012 KNSB Dutch Single Distance Championships took place in Heerenveen at the Thialf ice skating rink on Saturday 5 November 2011. Although this tournament was held in 2011, it was part of the 2011–2012 speed skating season .

There were 20 participants.

Title holder was Ireen Wüst.

The first 5 skaters qualified for the next following 2011–12 ISU Speed Skating World Cup tournaments.

Overview

Result

Draw

Source:

References

Single Distance Championships
2012 Single Distance
World